Galimullina is a surname of Tatar origin. Notable people with the surname include:

 Diana Galimullina (born 1994), Russian model
 Iuliia Galimullina (born 2001), Russian racing cyclist

Tatar-language surnames